

Legend

List

References

1988-89